HR 5553 is a binary star system located thirty-eight light-years away from the Sun, in the northern constellation Boötes. It has the variable star designation DE Boötis, and is classified as an RS Canum Venaticorum variable that ranges in apparent visual magnitude from 5.97 down to 6.04, which is bright enough to be dimly visible to the naked eye.

Orbital elements for this single-lined spectroscopic binary was first calculated in 1981 using radial velocity measurements from David Dunlap Observatory combined with older measurements from Mount Wilson Observatory and Dominion Astrophysical Observatory. The two stars orbit each other with a period of 125 days and a large eccentricity of 0.51.

The primary, designated component A, is a K-type main sequence star with a stellar classification of K0 V. It is around one billion years old and is spinning with a projected rotational velocity of 4 km/s.The star has 84% of the mass of the Sun and 86% of the Sun's radius. It is radiating 50% of the luminosity of the Sun from its photosphere at an effective temperature of 5,313 K. Component B has an estimated 45% of the mass of the Sun.

An infrared excess has been detected around this system, most likely indicating the presence of a circumstellar disk at a radius of 34.2 AU. The temperature of this dust is 40 K. The estimated mass of the dust is 0.0002 times the mass of the Earth. It is aligned to within 10° of the plane of the binary system.

References

External links 
 
 NStars: 1453+1909

K-type main-sequence stars
Bootis, DE
RS Canum Venaticorum variables
Binary stars
Spectroscopic binaries

Boötes
Durchmusterung objects
0567
131511
072848
5553
Boötis, DE